Xavier Saelens (born 1965) is a Belgian scientist and currently his main research interest is finding a universal influenza vaccine. He is a lecturer in Virology and Group Leader of the Molecular Virology Unit at the University of Ghent (Ghent, Belgium).

Education
He obtained a bachelor's degree in Biology at the University of Ghent in 1985, and a master's degree in Biotechnology and also a PhD in Biotechnology (1990). Saelens is married and has two children.

Career
He worked as a Postdoc at the University of Ghent from 1990 until 2004 and he is VIB Project Leader since 2005. His current research focuses on the development and characterisation of novel influenza A and B vaccines. Together with Walter Fiers and their team, he works on the development of an M2e-based vaccine.

References

External links
 Dr Xavier Saelens (EU Influenza research)
 Xavier Saelens (VIB)
 Universal flu vaccine being tested on humans 17 July 2007

Belgian virologists
1931 births
Living people
Ghent University alumni
Academic staff of Ghent University